The Arkhangelske gas field natural gas field is located in the north-western part of the continental shelf of the Black Sea. It was discovered in 1989 and developed by Chornomornaftogaz and Shelton Canada.

Arkhangelske field began production in 1991 and produces natural gas and condensates.

References

Natural gas fields in Ukraine
Black Sea energy
Economy of Crimea
Natural gas fields in the Soviet Union
Chornomornaftogaz property